Spears Creek is a  long first-order tributary to Marshyhope Creek in Dorchester County, Maryland.

Course

Watershed
Spears Creek drains  of area, receives about 44.1 in/year of precipitation, and is about 21.26% forested.

See also
List of Maryland rivers

References

Rivers of Maryland
Rivers of Dorchester County, Maryland
Tributaries of the Nanticoke River